Jurjen van der Velde (born 4 December 2002) is a Dutch professional darts player who currently plays in Professional Darts Corporation (PDC) events. He is a JDC World Darts Champion, winner of the World Youth Masters and a multi-medalist at the WDF Europe Cup Youth.

Career
Jurjen is considered to be one of the most talented youth players ever and was already able to win a large part of the most important youth titles at the age of 15. The Dutchman made his breakthrough in 2018 after having had very good results with the NDB (Dutch Dart Association) for some time. At the German Open, van der Velde celebrated his first big youth title. After a strong performance, he only lost one leg in the semi-finals, followed by a whitewash in the final.

Jurjen also won the singles competition at the 2018 WDF Europe Cup Youth, defeated Keane Barry in the decider leg. In the team competition and the general classification, he also won a gold medals, and in the pair competition – silver. This was followed by victory at the World Youth Masters, where he again won the deciding leg against Keane Barry. As a result, van der Velde was invited to the 2018 Finder Youth Darts Masters, but was narrowly eliminated in the group-stage. He ended the year of success with a victory in the JDC World Darts Championship against Lennon Cradock.

In 2019, he was invited by the home federation to participate in the 2019 WDF World Cup for the youth players and to participate in the 2019 WDF Europe Cup Youth. During the WDF World Cup, he won two bronze medals in youth competitions. In the singles tournament, he was surprisingly eliminated in a semi-finals match against Mehrdad Seyfi. During WDF Europe Youth Cup, he won two gold and two silver medals.

In 2019, he also plays at the PDC Development Tour and reached Last 16 phase on his first weekend. Good results throughout the PDC Development season allowed him to take part in the 2019 PDC World Youth Championship. In the tournament, he joined the group with Joe Davis and Max Hopp. After two matches lost, he ended his participation in the group-stage.

In 2020, he only made the Last 32 phase once in ten events on the Development Tour and his career slowed down a bit. At the 2020 PDC World Youth Championship he was eliminated in the group-stage by losing to Ted Evetts, but he finished second thanks to a victory over Vilém Šedivý. In 2021, he won his first Professional Darts Corporation event at the youth's stage and qualified for the 2021 PDC World Youth Championship. He went to a very difficult group with Kevin Doets, Rusty-Jake Rodriguez and Fabian Schmutzler, where he lost all matches and took last place in his group. 

In early 2022, he qualified for the 2022 UK Open, despite missing a tour card at PDC Q-School. He defeated Mickey Mansell in the first round by 6–4 in legs. In the second round he faced Jim Williams and lost to him by 3–6 in legs. At the beginning of May 2022, he had his second victory on the PDC Development Tour before celebrating his first triumphs on the PDC Challenge Tour in July and September. Meanwhile, in June 2022, he participated in the 2022 Dutch Open and was eliminated in the quarter-finals, lost to eventual winner Jelle Klaasen by 2–5 in legs.

Performance timeline

PDC European Tour

References

2002 births
Living people
Dutch darts players
Professional Darts Corporation current tour card holders
21st-century Dutch people